The 1922 VFL Grand Final was an Australian rules football game contested between the Fitzroy Football Club and Collingwood Football Club, held at the Melbourne Cricket Ground in Melbourne on 14 October 1922. It was the 25th annual Grand Final of the Victorian Football League, staged to determine the premiers for the 1922 VFL season.

The half-time break was more than thirty minutes.

The match, attended by 50,064 spectators, was won by Fitzroy by a margin of 11 points, marking that club's seventh premiership victory.

Score

Teams

 Umpire - Jack Elder

Statistics

Goalkickers

Footnotes

References
 AFL Tables: 1922 Grand Final
 Football: Fitzroy First: A Dazzling Six Minutes, The Argus, (Monday, 16 October 1922), p.3.
 Fitzroy Premiers: Keen, Strong Game, The Age, (Monday, 16 October 1922), p.11.

See also
 1922 VFL season

VFL/AFL Grand Finals
Grand
Fitzroy Football Club
Collingwood Football Club
October 1922 sports events